The Dṛg-Dṛśya-Viveka or Vâkyasudhâ is an Advaita Vedanta text attributed to Bhāratī Tīrtha or Vidyaranya Swami (c. 1350)

Authorship
Although also attributed to Adi Shankara, the text is most commonly attributed to Bharatī Tīrtha (c. 1350). It is also known as Vakya Suddha, which is attributed to Adi Shankara.

Contents
The Dṛg-Dṛśya-Viveka contains 46 slokas performing an inquiry into the distinction between the "seer" (Dṛg) and the "seen" (Dṛśya), an overview of samadhi, centering on savikalpa and nirvikalpa, and the identity of Atman and Brahman.

See also
 Self-enquiry
 Ajativada
 Viveka
 Sakshi (Witness)

References

Sources

Printed sources

 
 
 

Web-sources

Further reading
 arshabodha.org, Drig Drishya Viveka
 
 International Vedanta Mission, Drig-Drishya Viveka

External links
 arshabodha.org, Swami Tadatmananda's lectures on Adi Shankaracharya's Drig Drishya Viveka
 Vedanta Society, Swami Sarvapriyananda's lectures on  Drig Drishya Viveka - 12 Part Series
 Infinity Foundation, Seer-Seen Discrimination
 Happines of Being blogspot, Dṛg-dṛśya-vivēka: distinguishing the seer from the seen
8 Audio lectures on Drg Drsya Viveka by Swami Tattwamayananda

Advaita Vedanta
Advaita Vedanta texts